Elphinstone Group is an Australian privately held company that manufactures and assembles heavy equipment for the mining industry. It has facilities in Burnie, Tasmania and in Victoria. The corporate group includes the William Adams Caterpillar dealer in Tasmania and Victoria.

Operations
Elphinstone Sustainable Energy & Engineering Solutions is a division of Elphinstone Group, formed by the acquisition of Southern Prospect. It provides design, manufacture and installation of electricity generation for remote sites.

Elphinstone was one of the bidders to supply new armoured vehicles to the Australian Defence Force through project Land 400. If successful, the vehicles would have been built in Tasmania. However their vehicle was not selected for phase two of testing by the Department of Defence.

Dale Elphinstone
Founder, Dale Elphinstone, started his working life as an apprentice at William Adams. He later bought the company. In 2016, Elphinstone was assessed as Tasmania's richest person by net worth and remains so as of 2019.

Dale Elphinstone's brother, Graeme, owns a similarly named company based at Triabunna, on the east coast of Tasmania.

References

Caterpillar Inc.
Companies based in Tasmania
Motor vehicle assembly plants in Australia
1975 establishments in Australia